Altericroceibacterium indicum is a gram-negative, rod-shaped and non-spore-forming bacterium from the genus Altericroceibacterium which has been isolated from the rhizosphere from the rice plant Porteresia coarctata in Pichavaram in India.

References

External links
Type strain of Altererythrobacter indicus at BacDive -  the Bacterial Diversity Metadatabase	

Sphingomonadales
Bacteria described in 2008